Lola Riera Zuzuarregui (born 25 June 1991) is a Spanish field hockey player and part of the Spain women's national field hockey team.

She was part of the Spanish team at the 2016 Summer Olympics in Rio de Janeiro, where they finished eighth. On club level in 2016 she played for SPV Complutense in Spain.

References

External links
 
http://www.gettyimages.com/photos/lola-riera?excludenudity=true&sort=mostpopular&mediatype=photography&phrase=lola%20riera
http://www.fieldhockey.com/archives/index.php/2016/40-june/894-news-for-08-june-2016
http://www.fieldhockey.com/archives/index.php/2015/29-august/589-news-for-08-august-2015

Living people
Olympic field hockey players of Spain
Field hockey players at the 2016 Summer Olympics
Field hockey players at the 2020 Summer Olympics
Spanish female field hockey players
Place of birth missing (living people)
1991 births